La Meilleraie-Tillay is a commune in the Vendée department in the Pays de la Loire region in western France.

Geography
The commune lies on the right bank of the river Lay, which forms all of the commune's southern border.

See also
Communes of the Vendée department

References

Communes of Vendée